Abū al-Ḥasan al-Ashʿarī (full name: Abū al-Ḥasan ʿAlī ibn Ismāʿīl ibn Isḥāq al-Ashʿarī; c. 874–936 CE/260–324 AH), often reverently referred to as Imām al-Ashʿarī by Sunnī Muslims, was an Arab Muslim scholar of Shafi jurisprudence, scriptural exegete, reformer (mujaddid), and scholastic theologian (mutakallim), renowned for being the eponymous founder of the Ashʿarite school of Islamic theology.

Al-Ashʿarī was notable for taking an intermediary position between the two diametrically opposed schools of Islamic theology prevalent at the time: Aṯharī and Muʿtazila. He primarily opposed the Muʿtazilite theologians, who advocated the use of rationalism in theological debate and believed that the Quran was created (makhlūq), as opposed to it being uncreated. On the other hand, the Ḥanbalites and Muḥaddithīn exclusively relied upon the strict adherence to literalism and the outward (ẓāhir) meaning of expressions in the Quran and ḥadīth literature, were opposed to the use of philosophy or kalām (dialectical theology), and condemned any theological debate altogether.

Al-Ashʿarī established a middle way between the doctrines of the aforementioned schools, based both on reliance on the sacred scriptures of Islam and theological rationalism concerning the agency and attributes of God. The Ashʿarite school of Islamic theology eventually became the predominant school of theological thought within Sunnī Islam. By contrast, Shīʿa Muslim scholars don't accept his theological beliefs, as al-Ashʿarī's works also involved refuting Shīʿīsm. Al-Ashʿarī wrote more than 90 works during his lifetime, little of which have survived to the present day.

Biography

Abū al-Ḥasan al-Ashʿarī was born in Basra, Iraq, and was a descendant of Abū Mūsa al-Ashʿarī, who belonged to the first generation of Muhammad's closest companions (ṣaḥāba). As a young man he studied under al-Jubba'i, a renowned teacher of Muʿtazilite theology and philosophy.

According to the traditional account, al-Ashʿarī remained a Muʿtazilite theologian until his 40th year, when he allegedly saw the Islamic prophet Muhammad in his dreams three times during the month of Ramaḍān. The first time, Muhammad told him to support what was narrated from himself, that is, the prophetic traditions (ḥadīth). Al-Ashʿarī became worried, as he had numerous strong proofs contradictory to the prophetic traditions. After 10 days, he saw Muhammad again: Muhammad reiterated that he should support the ḥadīth. Subsequently, al-Ashʿarī forsook kalām (dialectical theology) and started following the ḥadīth alone. On the 27th night of Ramaḍān, he saw Muhammad for the last time. Muhammad told him that he had not commanded him to forsake kalām, but only to support the traditions narrated from himself. Thereupon, al-Ashʿarī started to advocate in favor of the authority of the ḥadīth reports, finding proofs for these that he said he had not read in any books.

After this experience, he left the Muʿtazilite school and became one of its most distinguished opponents, using the philosophical methods he had learned from them in order to refute their theological doctrine. Then, al-Ashʿarī spent the remaining years of his life engaged in developing his views and in composing polemics and arguments against his former Muʿtazilite colleagues. Al-Ashʿarī wrote more than 90 works during his lifetime, many of which have survived to the present day.

Views
After leaving the Muʿtazila school, and joining the side of traditionalist theologians al-Ash'ari formulated the theology of Sunni Islam through Kalam, following in the footsteps of Ibn Kullab a century earlier. He was followed in this by a large number of distinguished scholars of Sunni Islam, many of whom belonged to the Shafi'i school of law. The most famous of these are Abul-Hassan Al-Bahili, Abu Bakr Al-Baqillani, Al-Juwayni, Al-Razi and Al-Ghazali. Thus Al-Ash'ari's school became, together with the Maturidi, the main schools reflecting the beliefs of the Sunnah. He is also known to have directly taught the Sufi Ibn Khafif.

In line with Sunni tradition, al-Ash'ari held the view that a Muslim should not be considered an unbeliever on account of a sin even if it were an enormity such as drinking wine or theft. This opposed the position held by the Khawarij. Al-Ash'ari also believed it impermissible to violently oppose a leader even if he were openly disobedient to the commands of the sacred law.

Al-Ash'ari spent much of his works opposing the views of the Muʿtazila school. In particular, he rebutted them for believing that the Qur'an was created and that deeds are done by people of their own accord. He also rebutted the Muʿtazili school for denying that Allah can hear, see and has speech. Al-Ash’ari confirmed all these attributes stating that they differ from the hearing, seeing and speech of creatures, including man.

He was also noted for his teachings on atomism. The Salafis argue that he had accepted the Salafi theology right before his death.

Legacy
The 18th century Islamic scholar Shah Waliullah stated: 
A Mujadid appears at the end of every century: The Mujadid of the first century was Imam of Ahlul Sunnah, Umar bin Abdul Aziz. The Mujadid of the second century was Imam of Ahlul Sunnah Muhammad Idrees Shaafi. The Mujadid of the third century was the Imam of Ahlul Sunnah, Abu al-Hasan al-Ash'ari. The Mujadid of the fourth century was Abu Abdullah Hakim Nishapuri.

Earlier major scholars also held positive views of al-Ash'ari and his efforts, among them Qadi Iyad and Taj al-Din al-Subki.

According to scholar Jonathan A.C. Brown, although "the Ash'ari school of theology is often called the Sunni 'orthodoxy,' "the original ahl al-hadith, early Sunni creed from which Ash'arism evolved has continued to thrive alongside it as a rival Sunni 'orthodoxy' as well." According to Brown this competing orthodoxy exists in the form of the "Hanbali über-Sunni orthodoxy".

Works
The Ashari scholar Ibn Furak numbers Abu al-Hasan al-Ash'ari's works at 300, and the biographer Ibn Khallikan at 55; Ibn Asāker gives the titles of 93 of them, but only a handful of these works, in the fields of heresiography and theology, have survived. The three main ones are:
Maqalat al-Islamiyyin wa Ikhtilfa al-Musallin ("The Discourses of the Proponents of Islam and the Differences Among the Worshippers"), an encyclopaedia of deviated Islamic sects. It comprises not only an account of the Islamic sects but also an examination of problems in kalām, or scholastic theology, and the Names and Attributes of Allah; the greater part of this works seems to have been completed before his conversion from the Muʿtaziltes.
Al-Luma`
Al-Luma` fi-r-Radd `ala Ahl al-Zaygh wa al-Bida` ("The Sparks: A Refutation of Heretics and Innovators"), a slim volume.
Al-Luma` al-Kabir ("The Major Book of Sparks"), a preliminary to Idah al-Burhan and, together with the Luma` al-Saghir, the last work composed by al-Ash`ari according to Shaykh `Isa al-Humyari.
Al-Luma` as-Saghir ("The Minor Book of Sparks"), a preliminary to al-Luma` al-Kabir.
Kitāb al-ibāna 'an usūl al-diyāna, though the authenticity of this book has been disputed by several scholars.

See also 
 Ash'ari
 Abu Musa al-Ash'ari
 Ibn Kullab
 Al-Tahawi
 Abu Mansur al-Maturidi
 Abu al-Mu'in al-Nasafi
 List of Ash'aris and Maturidis
 List of Muslim theologians
 List of Muslim comparative religionists
 2016 international conference on Sunni Islam in Grozny

Early Islam scholars

References

External links
Imam Abu‘l-Hasan al-Ash‘ari by Shaykh Gibril Haddad
Imam Ash’ari Repudiating Asha’rism? by Shaykh Nuh Keller

Further reading

870s births
936 deaths
9th-century Arabs
9th-century Muslim theologians
10th-century Arabs
10th-century Muslim theologians
Arab Sunni Muslim scholars of Islam
Asharis
Atomists
Hadith scholars
Kullabis
Maliki fiqh scholars
Mujaddid
Muslim scholars of Islamic jurisprudence
Mu'tazilites
People from Basra
Quranic exegesis scholars
Salaf
Scholars from the Abbasid Caliphate
Sunni imams
Sunni Muslim scholars of Islam
Shafi'i fiqh scholars
Shaykh al-Islāms